Events from the year 1374 in Ireland.

Incumbent
Lord: Edward III

Events
 William Tany, Prior of the Order of St. John of Jerusalem appointed Lord Chancellor of Ireland

Births

Deaths

References

 
1370s in Ireland
Ireland
Years of the 14th century in Ireland